Cristina Fonseca is a Portuguese tech entrepreneur, Angel investor and Engineer, better known as one of the founders of Talkdesk, a cloud-based help desk software that became Portugal's third "unicorn" after raising US$100M in series B funding at a valuation of over US$1 billion in October 2018.

She is an alumnus of the Instituto Superior Técnico of Lisbon where she studied telecommunications and networks engineering. Fonseca later did the Global Solutions Program at Singularity University and specialised in Artificial Intelligence.

In 2016 Fonseca was featured in the Forbes 30 Under 30 list under the enterprise technology category and in 2017 she became an Agenda Contributor to the World Economic Forum.

In 2018, Fonseca became a venture partner at Indico Capital Partners, the first Portuguese private venture capital fund investing in Portugal and Spain early-stage, tech-focused startups.

References

External links 
 Official Twitter

1987 births
Living people
Portuguese engineers
20th-century Portuguese businesspeople
21st-century Portuguese businesspeople
Instituto Superior Técnico alumni